The Battle of Kuopio was fought between Swedish and Russian forces at Kuopio in Northern Savonia on 12 May 1808 during the Finnish War.

Background
As a result of the victory at Pulkkila Sandels could commence operations to the south and harass the Russian supply lines. He first struck against a number of Russian transports heading for Raahe, south of Pulkkila, capturing two supply and one weapon transports, along with 100 Russians. Another transport column was captured northwest of Kuopio. Sandels then sent a vanguard of 150 men (of which 80 from the Västerbotten Regiment), under Karl Wilhelm Malm, to attack a Russian supply magazine at Kuopio where there was also an improvised field hospital. On their way they managed to surprise and destroy a Russian force of 150 men, sent out from Kuopio to retake the lost supplies; seven Russians were killed and 98 captured to no Swedish losses.

Battle
As Malm arrived in the vicinity of Kuopio on the 11th he was joined by approximately 300 peasants. However, only about 50 of them carried firearms, and so Malm thought it was best to have them encircling the town rather than following in the attack. On 12 May, at 2:00 AM, Malm split his infantry into three groups of 50 men each, after which he commenced the attack. The complete surprise, combined with the darkness and the lack of Russian command, shattered the Russian defense; they were met by stubborn resistance only in the chancellery, where a couple of Russians had taken up positions. By 6:00 AM the rest of the Russians surrendered; they had lost 40 killed and wounded and 160 captured, apart from a few civilians and 124 sick soldiers. Two officers and about 70 men had managed to escape despite the peasants encircling the town. The Swedes had lost two men killed and one wounded. The bulk of the Swedish force arrived at Kuopio on 20 May.

Notes, citations and sources

Notes

Citations

Sources

Kuopio 1808
Kuopio
1808 in Finland
Kuopio
Kuopio
May 1808 events